Bellatrix Aerospace, is an Indian private aerospace manufacturer and small satellite company, headquartered in Bangalore, India. The company was established in 2015. It plans to launch its own rocket named Chetak in 2023. The two-stage Chetak rocket is powered by a number of their own Aeon engines. The Chetak rocket will use liquid methane as fuel. In 2019 it announced plans to use water as propellant for an electric propulsion system. On 8 February 2021 they announced that they partnered with Skyroot Aerospace. On 9 February 2022, Rohan announced on Twitter that Bellatrix has stopped work on its rocket.

In June 2022, the company raised $8 million in a Series A funding round to pursue the development of in-space propulsion systems.

See also
 
 Comparison of orbital launch systems
 Indian Space Research Organisation
 New Space India Limited
 Pixxel
 Satellize
 List of private spaceflight companies
 Skyroot Aerospace

References

External links
 

Indian private spaceflight companies
Private spaceflight companies
Rocket engine manufacturers of India
Commercial launch service providers
Spacecraft manufacturers
Indian companies established in 2015
Manufacturing companies based in Bangalore
Indian brands
2015 establishments in Karnataka